Roberto Cifuentes Parada (born 21 December 1957, Santiago, Chile) is a Chilean chess master.

He won five times Chilean Chess Championship (1982–1986), and played seven times for Chile in Chess Olympiads (1978–1990). He also twice represented Chile in the Panamerican Team Chess Championship (1985 and 1987), and won individual gold and bronze, and team silver and bronze medals. He tied for 5-6th at San Pedro de Jujuy 1981 (Pan American Chess Championship, won by Zenon Franco), won at Asunción 1986, took 6th at Santiago de Chile 1987 (the 13th Torneo Zonal Sudamericano, Gilberto Milos won), and took 2nd, behind Mikhail Tal, at Rio Hondo 1987.

Then he left Chile for the Netherlands, where he took 2nd place in the Dutch Chess Championship in 1993. He represented the Netherlands in the period 1992–2001. Among others, he took 3rd in the 30th Capablanca Memorial at Matanzas, Cuba 1995 (Tony Miles won).
Next, he moved to Spain, and played for his new country in the 36th Chess Olympiad at Calvià 2004.

He was awarded the Grandmaster title in 1991. On the January 2010 FIDE Elo rating list, he has a rating of 2525.

Cifuentes is interested in computer chess and often writes on this subject.

References

External links
 
 Roberto Cifuentes - Articles - New In Chess

1957 births
Living people
Chilean chess players
Dutch chess players
Spanish chess players
Chess grandmasters
Chess Olympiad competitors